Health::Disco2 is a remix album by American noise rock band Health.  It features remixes of songs from the album Get Color by various artists, as well as one new track by Health.

Track listing
"USA Boys" - 4:06
"Before Tigers (CFCF RMX)" - 4:39
"In Heat (Javelin RMX)" - 3:13
"Die Slow (Tobacco RMX)" - 4:07
"Severin (Small Black RMX)" - 3:56
"Before Tigers (Gold Panda RMX)" - 5:23
"Eat Flesh (Crystal Castles RMX)" - 3:59
"In Violet (Salem RMX)" - 3:00
"Nice Girls (Blondes RMX)" - 8:08
"Die Slow (Pictureplane RMX)" - 3;15
"Nice Girls (Little Loud RMX)" - 4:24
"Before Tigers (Blindoldfreak RMX)" - 4:52

Download-only bonus track version:
"In Violet (Hidden Cat RMX)" -  6:48
"Die Slow (Nastique RMX)" - 5:33
"Eat Flesh (Baron von Luxxury RMX)" - 4:06
"Die Slow (Nite Jewel RMX)" - 5:34
"Before Tigers (Rainbow Arabia RMX)" - 3:26
"We Are Water (Soft Encounter RMX)" - 3:44
"Death+ (Clipd Beaks RMX)" - 3:52
"Severin (Yip-Yip RMX)" - 3:13
"Death+ (Delivery RMX)" - 7:27
"In Heat (Rodion RMX)" - 6:02
"We Are Water (Azari & III RMX)" - 5:24
"Die Slow (Pink Stallone RMX)" - 6:20

Charts

References

External links

Health (band) albums
2010 remix albums
Lovepump United albums